Triple Play 2002 is a baseball sports game released for PlayStation 2 and Xbox in 2002. On the cover is Arizona Diamondbacks player Luis Gonzalez. It is the only game in the Triple Play series to be released on Xbox, and the last game in the series to date.

Reception

The game received "mixed" reviews on both platforms, according to the review aggregation website Metacritic. In Japan, where the PS2 version was ported under the name  on September 26, 2002, Famitsu gave it a score of 26 out of 40.

References

External links
 

2002 video games
Baseball video games
EA Sports games
Major League Baseball video games
Pandemic Studios games
PlayStation 2 games
Video games developed in the United States
Xbox games